Yanick Étienne ( 1957 – 30 March 2022) was a Haitian singer and backing vocalist. She performed backing vocals on the hit song, "Avalon" by Roxy Music in 1982. She was the mother of rapper and producer Dernst Emile II, better known as D'Mile.

Étienne was born in Haiti and died from cancer on 30 March 2022, at the age of 64.

Career
Étienne started her recording career in 1982, performing the backing vocals on the Roxy Music song, "Avalon". She later appeared on three Bryan Ferry solo studio albums, Boys and Girls (1985), Bête Noire (1987), and Mamouna (1994).

Discography

Solo albums
 Love Songs for You (2004)
 Dernst Emile Presents:  Yanick Etienne  (1990)

References

External links
 Interview about Roxy Music album Avalon
 
 

1950s births
2022 deaths
Year of birth missing
20th-century Haitian women singers